Shin Dong-gun is a Korean name. Relevant people of this name are:

 Shin Dong-kun (born 1961): South Korean dentist and politician
 Shin Dong-keun (born 1981): South Korean football player
 Shin Dong-geun or Peniel Shin (born 1993): Korean-American singer and a member of Kpop boy band BtoB